Orlovačko Lake is a lake in Republika Srpska, Bosnia and Herzegovina. It is located in the municipality of Kalinovik.

See also
List of lakes in Bosnia and Herzegovina

References

Lakes of Bosnia and Herzegovina